The men's 100 kg competition at the 2021 European Judo Championships was held on 18 April at the Altice Arena.

Results

Final

Repechage

Top half

Bottom half

References

External links
 

M100
European Judo Championships Men's Half Heavyweight